Auenwald is a municipality in the district of Rems-Murr in Baden-Württemberg in Germany.

Twin town 
The twin town of Auenwald is:
  Beaurepaire, Isère, France, since 1987

References 

Rems-Murr-Kreis
Württemberg